2017 J.League Cup Final was the 25th final of the J.League Cup competition. The final was played at Saitama Stadium 2002 in Saitama on November 4, 2017. Cerezo Osaka won the championship.

Match details

See also
2017 J.League Cup

References

J.League Cup
2017 in Japanese football
Cerezo Osaka matches
Kawasaki Frontale matches